The New Testament is the second division of the Christian biblical canon.

The New Testament may also refer to:

 The New Testament (film), a 1936 French comedy directed by Sacha Guitry
 The New Testament (The Truth), a 2004 album by Suga Free
 The New Testament, a 2014 book by Jericho Brown

See also
 A New Testament (disambiguation)